Sound of Seil is a car and passenger ferry, operated by Western Ferries on the upper Clyde between Gourock and Dunoon, Scotland.

History
Sound of Seil was built by Cammell Laird of Birkenhead. She was launched into the River Mersey by crane on 25 July 2013.

Layout
Sound of Seil and her sister,  were a development of the design of the earlier fleet members. They have a single car deck with 194 lane-metres between bow and stern ramps. There is a passenger lounge. The ferries use LED lighting and enhanced heat recovery.

Service
Along with up to three other vessels, Sound of Seil operates Western Ferries Clyde service between McInroy's Point (Gourock) and Hunters Quay (Dunoon). This 2.2 nautical mile crossing allows vehicles to avoid the A83 "Rest and be thankful".

References

2013 ships
Ferries of Scotland